Abdelhak Kherbache (born 25 June 1995) is an Algerian freestyle wrestler. At the African Wrestling Championships, he won a total of seven medals: three gold, three silver, and one bronze. He is also a two-time medalist, including gold, at the African Games. He competed in the men's 57 kg event at the 2020 Summer Olympics held in Tokyo, Japan.

Career 

He represented Algeria at the 2019 African Games held in Rabat, Morocco, and he won the gold medal in the men's freestyle 57 kg event. Four years earlier, he also competed at the African Games in this event and won one of the bronze medals at the time.

In 2020, he competed in the men's 57 kg event at the Individual Wrestling World Cup held in Belgrade, Serbia. He qualified at the 2021 African & Oceania Wrestling Olympic Qualification Tournament to represent Algeria at the 2020 Summer Olympics in Tokyo, Japan.

He won the gold medal in his event at the 2022 African Wrestling Championships held in El Jadida, Morocco. He lost his bronze medal match in the 65 kg event at the 2022 Mediterranean Games held in Oran, Algeria.

Major results

References

External links 
 

Living people
1995 births
Place of birth missing (living people)
Algerian male sport wrestlers
African Games gold medalists for Algeria
African Games bronze medalists for Algeria
African Games medalists in wrestling
Competitors at the 2015 African Games
Competitors at the 2019 African Games
African Wrestling Championships medalists
Wrestlers at the 2020 Summer Olympics
Olympic wrestlers of Algeria
Competitors at the 2022 Mediterranean Games
Mediterranean Games competitors for Algeria
21st-century Algerian people